Derrymacash is a small village and townland in County Armagh, Northern Ireland. It is about four miles west of Lurgan, between the M1 motorway and Lough Neagh. It had a population of 629 in the 2001 Census.

A Catholic church and primary school (both called St Patrick's) are in neighbouring Aghacommon. Many people mistake the townlands of Derrymacash and Aghacommon. Derrymacash starts after one crosses the Closet River, just beyond the M1 bridge, heading towards Lough Neagh.


Places of interest
Near Derrymacash is the nature reserve Oxford Island, which is famed for its peaceful nature trails, bogland, bird hides and many species of wildlife.

Sport 
The main sports in Derrymacash are Gaelic football and camogie, represented by the Wolfe Tone and St Enda's teams, respectively, both playing their home games in Páirc na Ropairí.

References

Villages in County Armagh
Townlands of County Armagh